Siraj is a given name and surname. Notable people with this name include:

Given name 
Agha Siraj Durrani (born 1953), Pakistani politician
Akhi Siraj Aainae Hind ( 1258–1357), 14th-century Sufi saint
Malik Siraj Akbar (born 1983), Baloch journalist
Mehdi Siraj Ansari (1895–1961), Persian politician
Siraj al-Din al-Bulqini ( 1324–1403), Egyptian scholar
Siraj al-Din al-Sakaki (1160–1228/29), Muslim scholar
Siraj al-Din al-Ushi (died 1179/80), Hanafi jurist
Siraj Al-Tall (born 1982), Jordanian footballer
Siraj Ali (born 1954), British restaurateur
Siraj-ud-Din Ali Khan Arzu (1687–1756), Indian Urdu language poet
Siraj Aurangabadi (1715–1763), Indian writer
Siraj Mehfuz Daud (1931–2010), Indian judge
Siraj Din ( 1974–76), Pakistani boxer
Siraj Fegessa (born 1971), Ethiopian politician
Siraj Gena (born 1984), Ethiopian marathon runner
Siraj Haider (1948–2018), Bangladeshi actor and director
Sirajul Haq (born 1962), Pakistani politician
Sirajuddin Haqqani (born  1973–80), Afghan warlord
Siraj Muhammad Khan (born 1947), Pakistani politician
Siraj Nassar (born 1990), Israeli footballer
Siraj Raisani (1963–2018), Pakistani politician
Siraj Sikder (1944–1975), Bangladeshi activist
Hasan Siraj Suja, Bangladeshi politician
Mohamad Siraj Tamim (born 1985), Lebanese sprinter
Siraj Kassam Teli (1953–2020), Pakistani businessman
Siraj ud-Daulah (1733–1757), Nawab of Bengal
Siraj ud-Din Muhammad ibn Abd ur-Rashid Sajawandi (died  1203), Iranian linguist
Siraj-ul-Haque, Pakistani television director
Siraj Wahhaj (born 1950), American imam
Siraj Williams (born 1984), Liberian sprinter

Surname 
Abd Allah Siraj (1876–1949), Arab politician
Anwar Siraj (born 1978), Ethiopian footballer
Farah Siraj, Jordanian singer
Golam Mohammad Siraj ( 1991–2019), Bangladeshi politician
Khatijun Nissa Siraj (1925–2023), Singaporean women's rights activist
Minhaj-i-Siraj (born 1193), Persian historian
Mohammed Siraj (born 1994), Indian cricketer
Muhammad Siraj-Din (born 1935), Pakistani wrestler
Waleed Siraj (born 1992), Sudanese footballer
Shahawar Matin Siraj ( 2004–06), Pakistani-American terrorist
Shajahan Siraj (1943–2020), Bangladeshi politician
Shakinul Siraj, Bangladeshi cricketer
Syed Mustafa Siraj (1930–2012), Bengali writer
Uthman Siraj ad-Din (1258–1357), Bengali Islamic scholar
Yasmin Siraj (born 1996), American figure skater

See also